, an aspect of waste management in Japan, is based on the Japanese Container and Packaging Recycling Law. Plastic, paper, PET bottles, aluminium and glass are collected and recycled. Japan’s country profile in Waste Atlas shows that in 2012 Recycling Rate was 20.8%.

Container and Packaging Recycling Act 

Also called Act on the Promotion of Sorted Collection and Recycling of Containers and Packaging, has been enforced since April 1997 by the Ministry of the Environment to reduce the waste of glass containers, PET bottles and paper cartons. Since April 2000 plastic containers and packages other than PET bottles have been included.

 The consumers are required to follow sorting guidelines established by the municipalities.
 The sorted waste is then collected by the municipalities and stored for collecting by the recycling company.
 Manufactures and business entities using containers and packages have to pay a recycling fee to the JCPRA, in accordance with the volume they manufacture or sell.
 Each year recycling business entities are selected by a public bidding in every local municipality where a waste storage site is located. They are assigned to collect and transport the waste from the storage sites to recycling facilities. To make sure the waste is getting recycled, these recycling business entities receive payment only after showing a delivery report, signed by the recipient of the recycled products.
If an item was disposed of improperly, a large red warning sticker is put on the offending rubbish bag to shame the person responsible.

Recycling of steel cans is not regulated by the law, but in 2006 about 99% of the municipalities collected and recycled them. According to its statistics 88.1% of steel cans have been recycled in 2006, maintaining the world's highest level.

In 2016, Dr. Yamakawa reported the state of the Packaging Recycling Act in detail, which would be the latest information available in English.

Other recycling acts and target products/materials 

  - enacted June 1998, enforced April 2001 
 Four large electrical home appliances: Air conditioners, television sets (CRT and LCD), refrigerators (including freezers) and washing machines (including cloth dryers).
Small WEEE recycling act (使用済小型電子機器等の再資源化の促進に関する法律, Siyou Zumi Kogata Denshi Kiki tō no Sai Shigenka no Sokushin ni kansuru Hōristu, formally referred to as "Act on Promotion of Recycling of Small Waste Electrical and Electronic Equipment") - enacted 2012 
Medium and small electrical and electronic equipment 
  - enacted May 2000 
 Concrete, asphalt/concrete, wood building/construction materials
 - enacted 2000, revised 2007 
Food waste from industries and business enterprises (Kitchen waste from households are not targeted)
  - enacted 2002 
ASR (automotive shredder residue), airbags, CFCs (Chlorofluorocarbons)
Act on the Promotion of Effective Utilization of Resources  (資源有効利用促進法, Shigen Yukō Riyou Sokushin Hō) - enacted May 2000 replacing "Act on the Promotion of Effective Utilization of Resources", enforced April 2001
Designated resources-saving industries
Designated resources-reutilizing industries
Specified resources-saved products
Specified reuse-promoted products
Specified labeled products (Required to be labeled to facilitate separated collection as shown in the Symbol section)
Specified resources-recycled products (Required to promote self-collection and recycling)
Compact rechargeable batteries (sealed lead acid batteries, sealed nickel-cadmium batteries, sealed nickel-metal-hydride batteries, lithium batteries)
Personal computers (including CRTs and liquid crystal displays) 
Specified by-products Required to promote the use of by-products as recyclable resources
Green procurement act (グリーン購入法, formally referred to as Act on Promotion of Procurement of Eco-Friendly Goods and Services by the State and Other Entities) - enacted May 2000, enforced April 2001  
To promote purchase of recycled products 
Act on Promotion of Resource Circulation for Plastics (プラスチックに係る資源循環の促進等に関する法律, Plastic ni kakaru Shigen Junkan no Sokushin tou ni kannsuru Hōritsu) - The cabinet decided the bill  in March 2021, and the act was enacted on 11 June 2021. It will enter into force within a year.

Symbols

Recycling plans 

On March 25, 2008 the Japanese Cabinet approved a plan that targets to reduce the total waste from about 52 million tons in 2007 to about 50 million tons in 2012 and to raise the waste recycling rate from 20 to 25%. Thermal recycling and a charging system for waste disposal services will be promoted.

3R Initiative 

This G8 initiative, first proposed at the G8 Summit in June 2004, aims to Reduce, Reuse and Recycle waste. At the G8 Environmental Minister Meeting in Kobe on May 24–26, 2008, the ministers agreed about the Kobe 3R Action plan. It intends to improve resource productivity, to establish an international sound material-cycle society and to bring forward 3Rs capacity in developing countries. According to this plan, Japan also announced a New Action Plan towards a Global Zero Waste Society, aimed to establish material cycle societies internationally.

The Japanese government set October as the official month for 3R promotions. This was done to specify and allocate deliberate time to encourage corporations and businesses to focus on the importance of reducing, reusing and recycling waste. During the promotion month, the government and other companies organise informative events and parties to publicise the ideas of a sound material-cycle society.

Scandals 

In January 2008 five paper companies in Japan were accused of misleading customers about the recycled paper content of their products. Oji Paper, the largest paper company in Japan, admitted that its copy and print paper contained 5 to 10% recycled paper, instead of the 50% stated. The president of Oji Paper apologized to its customers, and the president of Nippon Pages, the second largest paper company in Japan, resigned to take responsibility. The Japanese Fair Trade Commission said it would investigate.

See also 
 Recycling
Sound Material-Cycle Society
 Waste management in Japan
 Electronic waste in Japan
 Mottainai - common Japanese expression, often used in this context

References

External links 

 The Japan Containers and Packaging Recycling Association
 3R Initiative on the Ministry of Environment homepage
 Japan for Sustainability
 PC 3R Promotion Association